Ahmet Fuat Bulca (1881 – September 14, 1962) was an officer of the Ottoman Army and the Turkish Army. He was also a politician of the Turkish Republic. He was the one of the closest friends of Mustafa Kemal (Atatürk), as well as his classmate at the Monastir Military High School.

He died in a car accident in Istanbul on September 14, 1962.

See also
List of high-ranking commanders of the Turkish War of Independence

Sources

External links

1881 births
1962 deaths
Military personnel from Thessaloniki
People from Salonica vilayet
Macedonian Turks
Committee of Union and Progress politicians
Republican People's Party (Turkey) politicians
Deputies of Rize
Deputies of Artvin
Ottoman Army officers
Turkish Army officers
Ottoman military personnel of the Italo-Turkish War
Ottoman military personnel of the Balkan Wars
Ottoman military personnel of World War I
Members of the Special Organization (Ottoman Empire)
Ottoman prisoners of war
World War I prisoners of war held by the United Kingdom
Turkish military personnel of the Greco-Turkish War (1919–1922)
Monastir Military High School alumni
Ottoman Military Academy alumni
Recipients of the Medal of Independence with Red Ribbon (Turkey)
Road incident deaths in Turkey
Burials at Turkish State Cemetery
Politicians from Thessaloniki